Digueillus (also Cligueillus or Eligueillus) was a legendary king of the Brythons according to Geoffrey of Monmouth.  He was the son of King Capoir and succeeded by his son Heli.  Geoffrey portrays him as a wise and modest ruler who cared greatly about the administration of justice among the Brythons.

References

Legendary British kings